The Embassy of Italy in London is the diplomatic mission of Italy in the United Kingdom. The front entrance is located on a private cul-de-sac in Mayfair, though there is also an entrance at the back on Grosvenor Square.

History
The house was built about 1728 as part of the development of Grosvenor Square by the Grosvenor family. However, it was not until 10 years later that the lease was purchased.  The first notable owner was the Earl of Malton, whose heirs leased the property until 1931. The Grosvenor estate required the house to be rebuilt in 1865.

In 1931, Italy was granted a lease for 200 years by Hugh Grosvenor, 2nd Duke of Westminster, for £35,000 and £350 per annum. Lord Gerald Wellesley was commissioned to convert the interior into suitable accommodation for an embassy.

Italy also maintains a number of other buildings in the capital: a Consular Section at 83-86 Farringdon Street, Farringdon, a Cultural Section at 39 Belgrave Square, Belgravia, a Defence Section at 7-10 Hobart Place, Belgravia, a Financial Section at 2 Royal Exchange, City of London, and a Trade Commission at 14 Waterloo Place.

Former locations were 35 Queen's Gate, South Kensington, and 20 Grosvenor Square.

Gallery

See also
Italy–United Kingdom relations

References

Bibliography

  As described in

External links
Embassy of Italy in London Official website

Italy
Diplomatic missions of Italy
Italy–United Kingdom relations
Italy